Khoshun-Uzur (Khoshuun Üzüür) is a rural locality (an ulus) in Mukhorshibirsky District, Republic of Buryatia, Russia. The population was 500 as of 2010. There are 8 streets.

Geography 
Khoshun-Uzur is located 32 km northwest of Mukhorshibir (the district's administrative centre) by road. Kharyastka is the nearest rural locality.

References 

Rural localities in Mukhorshibirsky District